Robert Drew (1575–1645) of Southbroom, Devizes, Wiltshire was an English lawyer and  politician who sat in the House of Commons at various times between 1597 and 1625.

Drew was the son of John Drew of Southbroom and his wife Eleanor Cooke, daughter of William Cooke of Lacock. He matriculated at Christ Church, Oxford on 11 February 1592 aged 18 and entered Middle Temple in 1592. He succeeded to the estate of Southbroom on the death of his father in 1614.

In 1597, Drew was elected Member of Parliament for Devizes.   On 18 May 1599 the Middle Temple benchers refused his call to the bar because he had not performed his "exercises of learning", but he was eventually called by 1602.  He was re-elected MP for Devizes in 1601. From 1603 he was a common councilman for Devizes, remaining in post until 1640. He was re-elected MP for Devizes in 1604 and was a J.P. for Devizes from 1606 to 1640. In 1625 he was elected MP for Devizes once again.

Drew died at the age of about 70. He had married Jane Jackman, daughter of John Jackman, citizen and grocer of London on 25 May 1602. They had six sons and five daughters.

References

1575 births
1645 deaths
People from Devizes
Alumni of Christ Church, Oxford
Members of the Middle Temple
English MPs 1597–1598
English MPs 1601
English MPs 1604–1611
English MPs 1625